Paromoionchis is a genus of air-breathing sea slugs, shell-less marine pulmonate gastropod mollusks in the family Onchidiidae. Most Paromoionchis species live on the mud in mangrove forests in the Indo-West Pacific.

Species 
. There are five species currently recognized in the genus:

 Paromoionchis boholensis Dayrat & Goulding, 2019
 Paromoionchis daemelii (Semper, 1880)
 Paromoionchis goslineri Dayrat & Goulding, 2019
 Paromoionchis penangensis Dayrat & Goulding, 2019
 Paromoionchis tumidus (Semper, 1880)

References 

Onchidiidae
Gastropod genera